The Executive Council of Australian Jewry, or ECAJ, is an official peak national body representing the Australian Jewish community. It is the umbrella organisation for over 200 Jewish organisations across Australia. It is the Australian affiliate of the World Jewish Congress, the worldwide umbrella organisation of Jewish communities. It is also affiliated with the Commonwealth Jewish Council, the Euro-Asian Jewish Congress, the Conference on Jewish Material Claims Against Germany, and the Memorial Foundation for Jewish Culture.

Overview 
ECAJ was created in 1944 as the peak body for the various state based representative bodies. Its councillors are elected via a collegiate electoral system. Of the ECAJ's 33 councillors, 25 are directly elected by the members of its constituent organisations, and eight are appointed by its affiliate organisations.

Syd Einfeld was President of the Executive Council of Australian Jewry between 1953–54, 1957–58, and 1961–62. Other distinguished Presidents who have served multiple terms have included Maurice Ashkenasy CMG QC (1948-1950, 1954-1956, 1958-1960, 1962-1964, 1966-1968) and Isi Leibler AO CBE (1978-1980, 1982-1985, 1987-1989, 1992-1995).

Platform and advocacy 
The ECAJ Policy Platform covers a broad range of issues, including human rights, indigenous issues, multiculturalism, interfaith relations, refugees, education, Holocaust remembrance, racial vilification, antisemitism, religious issues, and Israel and the international community. The ECAJ website includes a pictorial history of Australia and Israel including government-to-government, commercial, cultural and people-to-people relationships between the two countries from the earliest years onward.

There have been criticisms of the organisation that they are not truly representative and that their elections are to narrow to a claim to represent all of Australia's Jews.

Nevertheless, no other organisation has emerged to challenge the ECAJ’s status as the most broadly-based Jewish communal organisation across Australia. It continues to enjoy access to leaders at the highest levels of government and politics (Evan Zlatkis, 'A ScoMo-norah’Australian Jewish News, 15 June 2020; Anthony Galloway, ‘By calling out antisemitism on the Left, Albanese has created room for himself’, Sydney Morning Herald/The Age/Brisbane Times, 15 July 2021).

Communal submissions 
One of the roles of ECAJ is to prepare submissions to the government on behalf of the Jewish community. This has been on a broad range of topics such as the statutory definition of charity, human rights, freedom of religion and labeling kosher foods.

ECAJ has also taken a stand against child sexual abuse which had a significant presence in the community. ECAJ advocated for the return of Malka Leifer from Israel to face abuse allegations, and issued an apology to abuse advocate, Manny Waks, who was abused as a child.

In 2019, ECAJ called on the government to offer more protections to faith-based hospitals, aged care facilities and housing providers, to allow organisations to continue to preference people of their own faith in service delivery. ECAJ co-CEO Peter Wertheim explained one of the relevant issues as follows:

“Another issue for faith-based hospitals, aged care facilities and accommodation providers is that many of them currently have constitutions which restrict their membership and that of their governing boards and committees wholly or mainly to people of their own faith.
 
This is especially important for numerically small faith communities like ours — and also, for example, the Greek Orthodox community. If these charitable Jewish service-providers would now be prohibited from restricting their membership and that of their governing boards and committees to Jewish people, they may eventually find themselves with a non-Jewish majority of members or governors who would be free to vote to abandon the organisation’s Jewish ethos and religious practices.

The new Bill expressly allows faith-based clubs to restrict their membership to people of their own faith but, oddly, there is no equivalent allowance for faith-based hospitals, aged care facilities and accommodation providers.” ('The Religious Discrimination Bill does not do enough to protect Australia’s Jewish community’, ABC Religion & Ethics, 16 January 2020.)

Anti-Semitism 
One of the roles of ECAJ is to monitor antisemitic instances in Australia. This includes the unprecedented 60% jump in incidents for 2018 on the back of an increase in 2017. This was seen mostly due to a sharp increase in white supremacist activity. Another significant rise was recorded in 2019.

They also strongly objected to the extremist politicians, Pauline Hanson and Malcolm Roberts coming to speak in the Jewish suburbs of Melbourne. They were invited by a Jewish extremist Avi Yemini, and many white nationalists were expected at the event, before it was cancelled. ECAJ in their statement with the Jewish Community Council of Victoria said that while they "generally support the right of people to express their opinions", they objected to this event going ahead.

Israel advocacy 
ECAJ, considers itself a peak body for Australian Jewry, but regularly conducts advocacy on behalf of Israel. This is in accordance with the ECAJ’s Constitution, whose objects include “To support and strengthen the connection of Australian Jewry with the State of Israel.”  Further, according to the authoritative Gen 17 study of the Australian Jewish community in 2017, 88% of Australian Jews feel a sense of responsibility to ensure that the State of Israel continues to exist in peace and security (p.64). 

One significant area of pro-Israel advocacy is in their opposition to the Boycott, Divestment, and Sanctions (BDS) campaign against Israel. ECAJ has rejected the BDS movement as anti-Semitic, although they did not join the legal proceedings against a Sydney professor brought by the group Shurat HaDin.

ECAJ submitted a complaint to Special Broadcasting Service (SBS) over their screening the TV series The Promise in November and December 2011. This complaint pointed to many examples of the negative stereotyping of the Jewish people throughout the series, in particular through the portrayals of the Jewish characters. This was later supported by the Chairman of the New South Wales Community Relations Commission, Stepan Kerkyasharian. His submission argued that the program was guilty of "the portrayal of an entire nation in a negative light" and noted "concern that the series negatively portrays the WHOLE of the Jewish People. Such a portrayal cannot be justified in ANY context."

In 2019 ECAJ also released a rebuttal against the Israeli journalist and political candidate, Orly Noy who claimed anti-Sephardi racism and Apartheid was deeply rooted in Israeli society.

References

Jews and Judaism in Australia